Rockwell Park is a public park in Bristol, Connecticut.  Located in a residential area west of downtown Bristol, it includes open spaces and woodlands on either side of the Pequabuck River.  Park amenities include a swimming pool, sports fields, and a playground.  Many of the park's buildings are built out of rustic cobblestone, and include several follies.  The park, the city's first public park,  was listed on the National Register of Historic Places in 1987.

Setting and layout
The Pequabuck River, a swiftly flowing stream, roughly bisects the western two-thirds of the park, running south of the park's eastern lobe. The northernmost portions of the park are heavily wooded steep terrain, and are undeveloped except for hiking trails. The southern portions are more level, and include two artificial ponds, a large lawn for passive recreation, and a cluster of sports fields and playground.

Architecture
The buildings and structures of the park are characterized by rustic cobblestone architecture.  The three main entrances to the park each have gates built out of cobblestone, that at Dutton Avenue the most elaborate.  The most architecturally sophisticated building is the Summerhouse, a pavilion structure featuring rounded arches and roof finials.

History
The park was donated to the city in 1914 by Albert Rockwell, the owner of a local manufacturer of automotive parts, doorbells, and other products. Rockwell retained Sheffield Arnold, a landscape architect based in Boston, Massachusetts, to design the park. The park's early inclusion of recreational amenities is typical of parks of the early 20th century, and a departure from earlier parks, which often emphasized carriage roads and passive uses. The Rockwells also regularly contributed additional funds for maintenance and new facilities. The park was the city's only public park until 1933.

See also
National Register of Historic Places listings in Hartford County, Connecticut

References

External links

Bristol Parks - Rockwell Park

Parks on the National Register of Historic Places in Connecticut
Historic districts on the National Register of Historic Places in Connecticut
National Register of Historic Places in Hartford County, Connecticut
Buildings and structures completed in 1914
Parks in Hartford County, Connecticut
Bristol, Connecticut
Historic districts in Connecticut